Sha Shingbee is a stir-fry type dish of sliced mutton with green beans in Tibetan cuisine.

See also

 List of lamb dishes
 List of Tibetan dishes

References

Tibetan cuisine
Lamb dishes